Jatt Punjab Da is a Punjwood film, which released in 1992.

Plot
Balwant (Yograj Singh) is a young man who has ongoing disputes with one of his neighbors Jang Singh (Deep Dhillon). The court gives a decision in Balwant's favor. Jang Singh is furious. He kills Balwant's father and frames Balwant for it. After 7 years imprisonment, Balwant returns home to find out that Jang Singh has also killed his brother. He takes a revenge by killing each person who was involved in his father's and brother's murder. And at the end, he kills Jang Singh. But he also dies multiple shots from the police.

Cast
 Yograj Singh as Balwant
 Daljeet Kaur as Balwant's sister-in-law
 Deep Dhillon as Jang Singh
 Neena Sidhu

Songs
 Faqir Mauliwala, 
 Dev Tharikewala 
 Gill Surjit

References

External links 
 

1992 films
Punjabi-language Indian films
1990s Punjabi-language films